Allan M. Ramsay is a Professor of Formal Linguistics in the Department of Computer Science at the University of Manchester.

Education
Ramsay's undergraduate degree was in Logic and Mathematics from the University of Sussex. After completing a Master of Science degree in Logic from the University of London, he returned to Sussex to complete a PhD in Artificial Intelligence. Prior to working at UMIST and the University of Manchester, he was Professor of Artificial Intelligence at University College Dublin.

Research
Ramsay's research focuses on Natural language processing, including morphology and syntax. He has published papers on the analysis of free word order languages, particularly morphology of the Arabic language, which poses a number of specific problems. Some of this research has been funded by the EPSRC.

References

Academics of the University of Manchester
People associated with the Department of Computer Science, University of Manchester
Linguists from England
Living people
Alumni of the University of London
Alumni of the University of Sussex
1953 births
Natural language processing researchers
Computational linguistics researchers